Twelve Eighteen Part I is the sixth studio album by Mexican-American Chicano rap recording artist Lil Rob. It was released on July 26, 2005 via Upstairs Records. Production was handled by Fingazz and Moox with executive producer John Lopez. The album was Lil Rob's most commercial success, reaching number 31 on the Billboard 200 albums chart in the United States. It spawned two singles: "Bring Out the Freak in You" and "Summer Nights", which both charted on the Billboard Hot 100 singles chart at numbers 85 and 36, respectively.

Track listing 

Sample credits
"Back in the Streets" contains elements from "I Was Married" by Billy Paul
"I Who Have Nothing" contains elements from "I Who Have Nothing" by Linda Jones

Chart history

References

External links

2005 albums
Lil Rob albums